The de la Cruz Collection is an art museum at 23 NE 41st Street, Miami, Florida, owned by the Cuban-born American businessman Carlos de la Cruz and his wife Rosa. It houses their art collection and is open to the public free of charge.

The de la Cruz Collection opened in 2009 and is housed in a 30,000 sq ft building, designed by John Marquette. The collection includes works by Isa Genzken, Christopher Wool, Felix Gonzalez-Torres, Mark Bradford, Peter Doig, Dan Colen, Nate Lowman.

Since 1998, ArtNews listed Rosa and Carlos de la Cruz in their worldwide survey of the "Top 200 Collectors".

References

External links

Art museums established in 2009
2009 establishments in Florida
Florida International University
Museums in Miami
Art museums and galleries in Florida